Anambra Central Senatorial District in Anambra State is one of the three Senatorial Districts in the State. It has seven local governments areas. These are: Awka North, Awka South, Njikoka, Anaocha, Idemili North, Idemili South and Dunukofia. There are 1,556 polling units (Pus) and 109 registration areas (RAs) as of 2019. INEC office in Amawbia,  Awka South LGA is the collation centre. This Senatorial District covers the Anambra State Capital, Awka, and its environs. It also has prominent and notable people.

Notable People in Anambra Central Senatorial District 
Uche Ekwunife, Senator

Micheal Ajegbo, Former Senator

Peter Obi, Former Governor of Anambra State

Dora Akunyili, Former NAFDAC Chairman

Tony Muonagor, Actor and Musician

Ifeanyi Okoye, Juhel Pharmaceutical

Notable Places in Anambra Central Senatorial District 
Nnamdi Azikiwe University, Awka

Chukwuemeka Odumegwu Ojukwu University Teaching Hospital, Amaku, Awka

Paul University

Government House, Awka

Professor Kenneth Dike State Central e-Library, Awka

List of senators representing Anambra Central

References 

Politics of Anambra State
Senatorial districts in Nigeria